The Big Sleep is a 1946 American film noir directed by Howard Hawks, the first film version of the 1939 novel of the same name by Raymond Chandler. The film stars Humphrey Bogart as private detective Philip Marlowe and Lauren Bacall as Vivian Rutledge in a story about the "process of a criminal investigation, not its results". William Faulkner, Leigh Brackett and Jules Furthman co-wrote the screenplay.

Initially produced in late 1944, the film's release was delayed by over a year due to the studio wanting to release war films in anticipation of the end of World War II. A cut was released to servicemen overseas in 1945 shortly after its completion. During its delay, Bogart and Bacall married and Bacall was cast in Confidential Agent. When the movie failed, reshoots were done in early 1946 meant to take advantage of the public's fascination with "Bogie and Bacall".

The film was finally released by Warner Bros. on August 31, 1946. The film was a critical and commercial success, and led to two more "Bogie and Bacall" films by Warner Bros.: Dark Passage (1947) and Key Largo (1948). In 1997, the original 1945 cut was restored and released. That same year, the U.S. Library of Congress deemed the film "culturally, historically, or aesthetically significant," and added it to the National Film Registry.

Plot
Los Angeles private detective Philip Marlowe is summoned to the mansion of General Sternwood, who wants to resolve "gambling debts" his daughter Carmen owes to bookseller Arthur Geiger. As Marlowe leaves, Sternwood's older daughter Vivian stops him. She suspects her father's true motive for hiring a detective is to find his protégé Sean Regan who disappeared a month earlier.

Marlowe goes to Geiger's shop, which is minded by Agnes Louzier, and then follows Geiger home. Hearing a gunshot and a woman's scream, he breaks in to find Geiger's body and a drugged Carmen, as well as a hidden camera empty of film. After taking Carmen home, he returns and discovers that the body has disappeared. During the night, Marlowe learns that Sternwood's driver, Owen Taylor, has been found dead in a limo floating off the Lido Pier, having been struck on the back of the head.

Vivian comes to Marlowe's office the next morning with scandalous pictures of Carmen that she received with a blackmail demand for the negatives. Marlowe returns to Geiger's bookstore and follows a car to the apartment of Joe Brody, a gambler who previously blackmailed General Sternwood. He then finds Carmen outside Geiger's house, where she insists that it was Brody who killed Geiger. They are interrupted by the landlord, gangster Eddie Mars.

Marlowe goes to Brody's apartment, where he finds Agnes and Vivian. They are interrupted by Carmen, who wants her photos. Marlowe disarms her and sends Vivian and Carmen home. Brody admits he was behind the blackmailing, having stolen the negatives from Taylor, but then has to answer the door and is shot. Marlowe chases the killer and apprehends Carol Lundgren, Geiger's former driver, who believes Brody is swindling him. Marlowe calls the police to arrest Lundgren.

Marlowe visits Mars' casino where he asks about Regan, who supposedly ran off with Mars' wife. Mars is evasive and tells Marlowe that Vivian is running up gambling debts. Vivian wins a big wager and then wants Marlowe to take her home. A stooge of Mars' attempts to rob Vivian but Marlowe knocks him out. While driving back, Marlowe presses Vivian on her connection with Mars but she admits nothing. Back at home, Marlowe finds a flirtatious Carmen waiting for him. She says she did not like Regan and mentions that Mars calls Vivian frequently. When she attempts to seduce Marlowe, he throws her out. The next day, Vivian tells him he can stop looking for Regan; he has been found in Mexico and she is going to see him.

Mars has Marlowe beaten up to stop him investigating further. He is found by Harry Jones: an associate of Agnes and besotted with her. Jones conveys her offer to reveal Mars' wife's location for $200. When Marlowe goes to meet him and be taken to her hiding place, he spots Canino, a gunman hired by Mars, who is there to find Agnes. As Marlowe watches from hiding, Canino threatens Jones until Jones tells him Agnes's location. Canino then forces Jones to have a "drink" which turns out to be poison. Afterward, Marlowe discovers that Jones lied about Agnes's location.

Agnes telephones the office while Marlowe is still there and he arranges to meet her. She has seen Mona Mars behind an auto repair shop near a town called Realito. When he arrives, Marlowe is attacked by Canino. He awakes tied up, with Mona watching over him. Vivian is there too and frees Marlowe, allowing him to get his gun and kill Canino. They drive back together and Marlowe calls Mars from Geiger's house, pretending to be still in Realito.

Mars arrives with four men, who set up an ambush outside. When Mars enters, surprised to see Marlowe, Marlowe says Mars has been blackmailing Vivian, as Carmen had killed Regan; Mars claims she did this in a mental haze, though Marlowe doubts Mars' credibility. He then forces Mars outside, where he is shot by his own men. Marlowe calls the police, telling them that Mars killed Regan, which may be the truth. He also convinces Vivian that her sister needs psychiatric care, and Vivian says to Marlowe of her own problems that there's "Nothing you can't fix."

Cast

 Humphrey Bogart as Philip Marlowe
 Lauren Bacall as Vivian Sternwood Rutledge
 John Ridgely as Eddie Mars
 Martha Vickers as Carmen Sternwood
 Sonia Darrin as Agnes Lowzier (uncredited)
 Dorothy Malone as Acme Bookstore proprietress
 Regis Toomey as Chief Inspector Bernie Ohls
 Peggy Knudsen as Mona Mars
 Charles Waldron as General Sternwood
 Charles D. Brown as Norris, Sternwood's butler
 Bob Steele as Lash Canino
 Elisha Cook, Jr. as Harry Jones
 Louis Jean Heydt as Joe Brody
 Trevor Bardette as Art Huck, gas station owner (uncredited)
 Tommy Rafferty as Carol Lundgren (uncredited)
 Ben Welden as Pete, Mars' henchman (uncredited)
 Tom Fadden as Sidney, Mars' henchman (uncredited)
 Theodore von Eltz as A.G. Geiger (uncredited)

Production

Writing

The Big Sleep is known for its convoluted plot. Similar to To Have and Have Not, there was no finalized script during filming due to the constant changes during production. The composition of the screenplay involved Hawks and three writers. Leigh Brackett and William Faulkner wrote alternating sections of the initial draft before exiting once they turned in their final draft. Jules Furthman and Hawks rewrote during production to help appease censorship from the Hays Office, which was vehement about excluding sexual themes.

In the novel, Geiger is selling pornography – then illegal and often associated with organized crime – and is a homosexual having a relationship with Lundgren. Carmen is described as being nude in Geiger's house and later nude and in Marlowe's bed. The sexual orientation of Geiger and Lundgren goes unmentioned in the film because explicit references to homosexuality were prohibited. Carmen's sexuality from the novel also became more thinly veiled. To pass the censorship Carmen had to be fully dressed and the pornographic elements could only be alluded to with cryptic references to photographs of Carmen wearing a "Chinese dress" and sitting in a "Chinese chair". A scene of her in Marlowe's bed was replaced with a scene in which she appears sitting fully dressed in Marlowe's apartment, for him to promptly kick her out. This scene was initially omitted from the 1945 cut, but restored for the 1946 version.

Midway through filming, Hawks and the cast realized that they did not know whether the chauffeur Owen Taylor had killed himself or was murdered. A cable was sent to Chandler, who told his friend Jamie Hamilton in a March 21, 1949 letter: "They sent me a wire ... asking me, and dammit I didn't know either".

Casting
Nina Foch had tested for screen role of Carmen. However, Hawks cast Vickers in the role after seeing a modeling photo of her. He worked with Vickers closely on the role of Carmen, and later convinced Warner Bros. to buy out her contract with Universal. Sonia Darrin was cast in the role of Agnes. Hawks did not like her initial screen test, but after supervising her makeup and wardrobe for another test, he cast her in the part. Her credit in the movie's credits were removed when Jack Warner entered into a feud with her agent Arthur Pine following the film's completion.

Production

Principal photography on the film took place on the Warner Bros. backlot from October 10, 1944, to January 12, 1945. Filming was meant to be completed in late November, but was continually delayed due to Bogart's increased drinking. He was in the process of ending his tumultuous marriage to his wife Mayo Methot following his affair with Bacall during To Have and Have Not . As a result of his drinking and abuse from Methot, Bogart was unable to work for several days. Warner Bros. studio head Jack L. Warner was frustrated that he was shut out of the production and sent a memo:"Word has reached me that you are having fun on the set. This must stop."

Post-production
Although post-production ended in March 1945, The Big Sleep was delayed by Warner Bros. until they had turned out a backlog of war-related films. Because the war was ending, the studio feared the public might lose interest in the films, while The Big Sleep subject was timeless. However, there are several indications of the film's wartime production, such as the female taxi driver who picks up Marlowe in one scene, with many traditionally male occupations being taken up by women following the draft. Wartime rationing also influences the film: dead bodies are called "red points", which referred to wartime meat rationing and Marlowe's car has a "B" gasoline rationing sticker in the lower passenger-side window, indicating he is essential to the war effort and therefore allowed eight gallons of gasoline per week.

Soon after completing The Big Sleep, Bogart divorced Mayo Methot and married Bacall in May 1945. In June, Bacall began filming for her first film without Bogart Confidential Agent. The film, released in November 1945, was deemed a critical and commercial disappointment, with Bacall's acting panned by critics. To capitalize on the "Bogie and Bacall" phenomenon that had developed, Bacall's agent Charles K. Feldman asked the studio to re-shoot scenes for The Big Sleep. Warner agreed, and these scenes were shot in early January 1946. Julius Epstein wrote the reshoots, but he was not given a credit.

Although only about twenty minutes of the film's original 1945 cut was removed and replaced, twenty minutes of was either condensed, altered, or eliminated entirely with new footage. For example, in the 1945 cut, Marlowe explores Geirger's house, where he doesn't in the 1946 release. A new sequence of Marlowe and Rutledge meeting in a restaurant was also added, replacing a ten-minute sequence of Marlowe meeting at the District Attorney's office, and Rutledge coming to Marlowe's office a second time. A number of actors from the first cut did not appear in the second cut. Pat Clark was initially cast as Mona Mars. However, Clark was unavailable when her scenes were reshot in January 1946. Peggy Knudsen was cast to replace her. James Flavin and Thomas E. Jackson were cast as Police Captain Cronjager and District Attorney Wade. However, the did not appear in the 1946 cut of the film when their scene – set in the District Attorney's office – was removed.

1997 release of the 1945 original cut
In the mid-1990s, the original 1945 cut was found in the UCLA Film and Television Archive. It was discovered that this version had been released to the military to show to troops in the South Pacific. Upon learning of this, numerous benefactors, such as American magazine publisher Hugh Hefner and Turner Classic Movies, raised the money to pay for its restoration. The original version of The Big Sleep was released in art-house cinemas in 1997 for a short exhibition run along with a comparative documentary about the cinematic and content differences between the 1945 cut and 1946 release.

Reception
The Big Sleep premiered in New York City on August 23, 1946, before being released on August 31. According to Warner Bros. records, the film earned $3,493,000 domestically and $1,375,000 foreign.

Critical response

Contemporary reviews
At the time of its 1946 release, Bosley Crowther said the film leaves the viewer "confused and dissatisfied", points out that Bacall is a "dangerous looking female" ..."who still hasn't learned to act" and notes:

The Big Sleep is one of those pictures in which so many cryptic things occur amid so much involved and devious plotting that the mind becomes utterly confused. And, to make it more aggravating, the brilliant detective in the case is continuously making shrewd deductions which he stubbornly keeps to himself. What with two interlocking mysteries and a great many characters involved, the complex of blackmail and murder soon becomes a web of utter bafflement. Unfortunately, the cunning script-writers have done little to clear it at the end.

Time film critic James Agee called the film "wakeful fare for folks who don't care what is going on, or why, so long as the talk is hard and the action harder" but insists that "the plot's crazily mystifying, nightmare blur is an asset, and only one of many"; it calls Bogart "by far the strongest" of its assets and says Hawks, "even on the chaste screen...manages to get down a good deal of the glamorous tawdriness of big-city low life, discreetly laced with hints of dope addiction, voyeurism and fornication" and characterizing Lauren Bacall's role as "an adolescent cougar".

Comparison of the 1945 original cut and 1946 release
Between the 1945 cut and the 1946 release, critics have become divided as to which version is superior. Some consider the 1945 cut to be the best, partly due to the inclusion of a scene at the District Attorney's office where the facts of the case, thus far, are laid out. Others consider the 1946 release to be the best due to it focusing more on the Bogart-Bacall pairing. Chandler praised Martha Vickers' performance in the original 1945 cut, feeling that she overshadowed Bacall's performance. He felt that the deletion of many of her scenes in the 1946 release were done to enhance Bacall's performance.

Film critic Roger Ebert preferred the 1946 version and said,

The new scenes [of the 1946 version] add a charge to the film that was missing in the 1945 version; this is a case where "studio interference" was exactly the right thing. The only reason to see the earlier version is to go behind the scenes, to learn how the tone and impact of a movie can be altered with just a few scenes... As for the 1946 version that we have been watching all of these years, it is one of the great films noir, a black-and-white symphony that exactly reproduces Chandler's ability, on the page, to find a tone of voice that keeps its distance, and yet is wry and humorous and cares.

In a 1997 review, Eric Brace of The Washington Post wrote that the 1945 original had a "slightly slower pace than the one released a year later and a touch less zingy interplay between Bogart and Bacall, but it's still an unqualified masterpiece".

Accolades

In 2003, AFI named Philip Marlowe the 32nd greatest hero in film. The film placed 202nd on the 2012 Sight & Sound critics' poll of the greatest films ever made and also received two directors' votes.

The Japanese filmmaker Akira Kurosawa cited The Big Sleep as one of his 100 favorite films. Roger Ebert included the film in his list of "Great Movies" and wrote,

Working from Chandler's original words and adding spins of their own, the writers (William Faulkner, Jules Furthman and Leigh Brackett) wrote one of the most quotable of screenplays: it's unusual to find yourself laughing in a movie not because something is funny but because it's so wickedly clever.

Home media

A region-1 (U.S. and Canada) DVD version of The Big Sleep was released in 2000. It is a double-sided, single-layer disc; with the 1946 theatrical version on side-A (114 m), and the 1945 version (116 m) on side-B. The 1946 opening credits appear on both versions, including Peggy Knudsen, who never appears in the original version. Nowhere is the original actress, Pat Clark, ever credited. The DVD also contains a 16-minute, edited version of the 1997 documentary comparing the two versions that is narrated by Robert Gitt, who worked on the restoration of the 1945 version. Film critic Walter Chaw writes of the DVD releases of The Big Sleep and To Have and Have Not (1944), "The fullscreen transfer of The Big Sleep is generally good but, again, not crystalline, though the grain that afflicts the earlier picture is blissfully absent. Shadow detail is strong—important given that The Big Sleep is oneiric—and while the brightness seems uneven, it's not enough to be terribly distracting. The DD 1.0 audio is just fine."

A Blu-ray edition was released by Warner Bros. in 2015. It "includes the 1945 cut of the film that was screened for overseas servicemen, running two minutes longer and containing scenes not used in the official release".

References

External links

 
 
 
 
 
 
 The Big Sleep essay by Daniel Eagan in America's Film Legacy: The Authoritative Guide to the Landmark Movies in the National Film Registry, A&C Black, 2010 , pages 393-394

1946 films
1940s crime films
Alternative versions of films
American crime films
American black-and-white films
American detective films
Films scored by Max Steiner
Films based on American novels
Films based on mystery novels
Films directed by Howard Hawks
Film noir
Films set in Los Angeles
Films with screenplays by Leigh Brackett
United States National Film Registry films
Warner Bros. films
Films with screenplays by Jules Furthman
Films with screenplays by William Faulkner
Films based on works by Raymond Chandler
1940s English-language films
1940s American films